Clematochaeta pacifer is a species of tephritid or fruit flies in the genus Clematochaeta of the family Tephritidae.

Distribution
Ethiopia.

References

Tephritinae
Insects described in 1968
Diptera of Africa